Language Problems and Language Planning is a peer-reviewed academic journal published by John Benjamins Publishing Company in cooperation with the Center for Research and Documentation on World Language Problems. Its core topics are issues of language policy as well as economic and sociological aspects of linguistics.

The journal has existed in its present form since 1977. A predecessor journal, called La monda lingvo-problemo ("The world language problem" in Esperanto), had appeared since 1969 published by Mouton and edited by Victor Sadler (1969–1972) and Richard E. Wood (1973–1976). The current editor-in-chief is Timothy G. Reagan (Nazarbayev University, Kazakhstan).

While many articles are in English, the journal is open for articles written in any language.

Abstracting and indexing 
The journal is abstracted and indexed in:

References

External links 
 
 Its page at Esperantic Studies Foundation

Sociolinguistics journals
John Benjamins academic journals
Multilingual journals
Publications established in 1977
Triannual journals